Love Like This is the debut studio album by American rock band The Summer Set.

Release
Released on October 13, 2009, the album was promoted on the band's tour with Cartel, This Providence, and The Bigger Lights. In January 2010, the group supported Every Avenue and Sparks the Rescue on their co-headlining US tour. In March 2010, the band appeared at the Extreme Thing festival. Between late June and early August, the band performed on Warped Tour. It was re-released on July 6, with a bonus Love Like Swift CD with five Taylor Swift song covers available only at Wal-Mart. From late March to early May 2011, the band supported All Time Low on their US tour. On April 11, UK-based independent record label LAB Records released Love Like This for the European market. In addition to the eleven tracks of the standard version, the release carried an acoustic rendition of "Chelsea" recorded at Hurley Studios, the five Taylor Swift cover songs performed at The Hoodwink New Jersey from 2010's Love Like Swift and another Taylor Swift cover, the iTunes-only bonus track "Fifteen." However, on this version tracks 1-11 are mastered from a lossy source, the audio quality thus being significantly inferior to the original U.S. release.

Track listing
All lyrics by B. Dales, J. Gomez, J. Montgomery, S. Gomez, J. Bowen, except where noted.

"The Boys You Do (Get Back at You)" – 3:04
"Punch-Drunk Love" – 3:10
"Chelsea" – 2:40
"Young" – 3:20
"Take It Slow" – 2:55
"Can You Find Me?" – 3:09
"Love Like This" (B. Dales, J. Gomez, S. Hollander, D. Katz) – 3:26 
"Girls Freak Me Out" – 2:45
"Passenger Seat" – 3:49
"This Is How We Live" – 2:47
"Where Are You Now?" – 4:26
featuring Dia Frampton of Meg & Dia

Personnel

The Summer Set
 Brian Dales - vocals
 John Gomez -guitar
 Stephen Gomez -bass
 Josh Montgomery - guitar
 Jessica Bowen - drums

Production
 Produced and engineered by Matt Grabe 
Additional production by Matt Squire
"Love Like This" produced by S*A*M and Sluggo

Charts

References

External links

Love Like This at YouTube (streamed copy where licensed)
 The Summer Set's AbsolutePunk.net Page

2009 albums
The Summer Set albums
Albums produced by S*A*M and Sluggo
Razor & Tie albums